Statistics of Meistaradeildin in the 1975 season.

Overview
There were 6 teams competing for the championship, and Havnar Bóltfelag won.

League table

Results

References
RSSSF

Meistaradeildin seasons
Faroe
Faroe
1975 in the Faroe Islands